Sphenomorphus maculatus, the spotted forest skink, maculated forest skink or stream-side skink is a species of skink found in China, South Asia and Southeast Asia.

Description
Physical Structure: Head tapered and flat. Tail tapered and as long as two times of snout–vent length. Trunk and eyelid covered with scales. Scales on the back towards the tail larger. . 

Color: Upper side of the head, body and tail is brown, with smooth scales, and faint darker markings. The throat and belly are pale and immaculate. On the flanks, beneath the dark stripe, a mottled zone comprising yellowish and brown spots. 

Length: Maximum: 19 cm, Common: 17 cm(SVL. 6 cm)

It is non-venomous and harmless to humans.

Distribution
Bangladesh, Bhutan, Cambodia, China (S Yunnan, SE Xizang = Tibet), India (Andaman and Nicobar Islands, Darjeeling), Malaysia, Myanmar, Nepal, Singapore, Sunda region (Brunei, Indonesia, Papua New Guinea, Timor-Leste), Thailand (Northern) and Vietnam.

Habitat 
Terrestrial; nocturnal; inhabits the vicinity of streams and small rivers in lowland and hilly areas. Found foraging among rocks and vegetation right at the waters edge.

Diet
Feeds on small insects and invertebrates.

Reproduction
Oviparous. Courtship and mating behavior is strictly ritualized and starts in April–June. Hatchlings emerge at the end of August–September .

Note
Death-feigning behavior has been observed in this species: In captivity all of these, when handled, dropped on their back and remained immobile for around 35–45 seconds. During this period the animal becomes stiff, stretching out its fore and hind limbs. Just before the animal regained mobility, a rapid heartbeat was observed and then the animal was seen to roll over very quickly on its feet and attempt a quick escape.

References

 Annandale, Nelson (1905). Contributions to Oriental Herpetology. Suppl. III. Notes on the Oriental lizards in the Indian Museum, with a list of the species recorded from British India and Ceylon. J. Asiat. Soc. Bengal 1(2):139-151.
 Blyth, E. (1854). Notices and descriptions of various reptiles, new or little-known. Part I. J. Asiat. Soc. Bengal  22 [1853]: 639–655.
 Shea, G.M. & Greer, A.E. (1998). Sphenomorphus melanochlorus (Vogt, 1932), a Junior Synonym of Sphenomorphus maculatus (Blyth 1853). Journal of Herpetology 32(2): 292–294.
 The Reptile Database (http://reptile-database.reptarium.cz/species?genus=Sphenomorphus&species=maculatus). 
 Yamasaki, T.; Hikida, T.; Nabhitabhata, J.; Panha, S. & Ota, H. (2001). Geographic variations in the common skink Sphenomorphus maculatus (Blyth, 1853) in Thailand, with re-validation of Lygosoma mitanense Annandale 1905 as its subspecies. Nat. Hist. J. Chulalongkorn Univ. 1(1):23-31.

External links
 
 http://www.ecologyasia.com/verts/lizards/streamside-skink.htm
 http://www.linknovate.com/publication/autecology-and-mating-behaviour-of-the-spotted-forest-skink-sphenomorphus-maculatus-blyth-1853-in-the-monsoon-forest-of-cat-tien-national-park-southern-vietnam-1699676/
 http://www.tistr.or.th/sakaerat/Flora_Fauna/reptile/REPTILE1/จิ้งเหลนภูเขาเกล็ดเรียบ.pdf

maculatus
Reptiles of Asia
Fauna of Southeast Asia
Reptiles of Thailand
Reptiles of Vietnam
Reptiles described in 1853
Taxa named by Edward Blyth